Dickerson Run is a  long 3rd order tributary to the Youghiogheny River in Fayette County, Pennsylvania.

Variant names
According to the Geographic Names Information System, it has also been known historically as:
Dickinsons Mill Run

Course
Dickerson Run rises in a pond about 1.5 miles northwest of Leisenring, Pennsylvania, and then flows north to join the Youghiogheny River at Liberty.

Watershed
Dickerson Run drains  of area, receives about 42.8 in/year of precipitation, has a wetness index of 335.92, and is about 51% forested.

References

 
Tributaries of the Ohio River
Rivers of Pennsylvania
Rivers of Fayette County, Pennsylvania
Allegheny Plateau